The Order of the Day of the Supreme Commander of the Armed Forces/President/Great Leader of the Revolution dated 8 March 1966 (Republican spelling ), colloquially known as President Sukarno's Order of the Day of 8 March 1966, was basically a statement that he was still the president of Indonesia, and was issued in response to a warning from Lt. Gen. Suharto two days previously that there was dissatisfaction among the officer corps of the Indonesian Military. It was followed three days later by the Order of 11 March, which effectively transferred authority to Suharto.

Text of the document
The document read as follows:

Notes

References
 

Transition to the New Order
Sukarno
1966 in Indonesia
1966 documents